is a Japanese-language song, and the third single, by Japanese band Antic Cafe. The song peaked at No. 91 on the Japanese singles chart. The two Japanese characters are pronounced kosumosu (こすもす).

Track listing
 "Ese Uranai" (似非占い) - 4:32
 "Touhi Kairo" (逃避回路) - 4:44
 "Duck no Magical Adventure" (ダックのマジカルアドベンチャー) - 7:37

References

An Cafe songs
2004 singles
2004 songs
Loop Ash Records singles